Cape Berteaux is a cape surmounted by a high rock peak between Mikkelsen Bay and Wordie Ice Shelf on the west coast of Graham Land. The French Antarctic Expedition under Charcot, 1908–1910, originally applied the name Berteaux to an island in essentially this position. The British Graham Land Expedition (BGLE) under Rymill, 1934–1937, identified the feature sighted by Charcot as the cape described above. It is named by Charcot for a Monsieur Berteaux who helped obtain funds for his expedition.

Further reading 
 Defense Mapping Agency  1992, Sailing Directions (planning Guide) and (enroute) for Antarctica, P 376

External links 

 Cape Berteaux on USGS website
 Cape Berteaux on AADC website
 Cape Berteaux on SCAR website

References 

Headlands of Graham Land
Fallières Coast